is a Japanese footballer currently playing as a left-back for Fagiano Okayama from 2023.

Career

Takagi begin first youth career with Buddy SC and Hosei University Daini HS as University Team until 2016. Takagi entered to Hosei University from 2017 to 2020 after he was graduation from university.

In March 2020, it was decided to join Yokohama FC from 2021, and at the same time it was approved as a Designated player.

Takagi officially joined Yokohama FC for 2021 season. On 27 February, he made his league debut by starting in his J1 opening match against Hokkaido Consadole Sapporo.

On 1 August 2022, Takagi loaned out to J2 club, Thespakusatsu Gunma from Yokohama FC. On 16 December 2022, he resigned due to expire of transfer period.

On 16 December 2022, Takagi officially transfer to J2 club, Fagiano Okayama for upcoming 2023 season after expiration contract at Yokohama FC.

Career statistics

Club
.

Notes

References

External links

1998 births
Living people
Sportspeople from Yokohama
Sportspeople from Kanagawa Prefecture
Association football people from Kanagawa Prefecture
Hosei University alumni
Japanese footballers
Association football defenders
J1 League players
J2 League players
Yokohama FC players
Thespakusatsu Gunma players
Fagiano Okayama players